Rock Spring is a unincorporated community and census-designated place located in northwest Georgia, United States, approximately  south of Chattanooga, Tennessee. It is in Walker County which resides in Georgia's 14th congressional district. Rock Spring is included in the Chattanooga, TN-GA Metropolitan Statistical Area.

It first appeared as a CDP in the 2020 Census with a population of 891.

Highlights
The nearest major city is Chattanooga, and the nearest incorporated cities are Chickamauga and La Fayette, a few minutes away. From Rock Spring it takes roughly twenty minutes to drive to the Chattanooga city limits, and about thirty-five minutes for downtown Chattanooga. There is a Georgia Department of Driver Services branch in the community. Rock Spring Elementary School, Saddle Ridge Elementary, and Saddle Ridge Middle School serves the community as part of the Walker County School District. Walker County has relocated its tag and tax office to a former bank building at the intersection of US 27 and Hwy 95.

History
Northwest Georgia has a significant history tied to the Civil War. The Battle of Chickamauga was fought in the Chickamauga area, and was one of the major battles of the war. Chickamauga and Chattanooga National Military Park spans over 9000 acres and is located in nearby Chickamauga.

Demographics

2020 census

Note: the US Census treats Hispanic/Latino as an ethnic category. This table excludes Latinos from the racial categories and assigns them to a separate category. Hispanics/Latinos can be of any race.

References

External links
Walker County Website
History of northwest Georgia website
Rock Spring Church of Christ website
Peavine Baptist Church
Rock Spring United Methodist Church
Rock Spring Athletic Association

Census-designated places in Walker County, Georgia
Unincorporated communities in Walker County, Georgia